Andrew Lawrence Bargh (born 15 April 1986) is a former motorcycle speedway rider from New Zealand. He is a former national champion of New Zealand.

Speedway career 
Bargh started his British leagues career in 2005 after doubling up with the Wimbledon Dons and the Mildenhall Fen Tigers for the 2005 Speedway Conference League. In 2005, he also became the New Zealand Under 21 champion. The following season in 2006, he rode for the Mildenhall Academy before joining the Isle of Wight Islanders in the Premier League for the 2007 season. He would also ride for Oxford Lions during their ill-fated 2007 campaign.

Bargh became champion of New Zealand, winning the New Zealand Championship in 2007.

Bargh's final season was with the Isle of Wight during the 2008 Premier League speedway season. He finished 3rd in the 2008 New Zealand Championship when attempting to retain his title.

Family
His uncle David Bargh was a four times New Zealand speedway champion.

References 

1986 births
Living people
New Zealand speedway riders
Isle of Wight Islanders riders
Mildenhall Fen Tigers riders
Wimbledon Dons riders